

List of Ambassadors

Orli Gil 2019-2021
Lironne Bar-Sade 2015 - 2019
Hagit Ben-Yaakov 2011 - 2015
Chen Ivri Apter 2006 - 2010
Gary Koren 2003 - 2006
Avraham Benjamin 2000 - 2003
Tova Herzl 1993 - 1996

References

Latvia
Israel